Oxen End is a hamlet on the B1057 road, in the Uttlesford District, in the English county of Essex.  It is located a few miles from the village of Great Bardfield.

References 
Essex A-Z (page 13)

Hamlets in Essex
Uttlesford